Plicadin is a coumestan found in the herb Psoralea plicata.

References

Coumestans
Phenols